Lush is the debut studio album by American indie rock musician Snail Mail, released on June 8, 2018 through Matador Records. The album was produced by Jake Aron.

Three singles preceded the release of the album: "Pristine", "Heat Wave", and "Let's Find an Out".

Lush was nominated for Best Rock Album at the Libera Awards.

Background and recording
Between 2016–2018, Lindsey Jordan put out her debut EP Habit, she signed a recording contract with Matador Records, she toured the US and Europe and graduated high school. In an interview with DIY magazine in 2018, Jordan said of the writing process for Lush, "I was putting pressure on myself to make something that mattered to me, so when I graduated it was even harder because it was like ‘Oh I have time [now], why do I not want to write?’” she explains of adapting to post-high school life during the space between working on the two releases. "I kind of had to teach myself to love [writing] again and do it for my own reasons; that’s sort of when all the songs started to be better."

Talking about her unique process an interview with Stereogum in 2018, Jordan said "I’ll just record a demo on my phone and wake up at 3 in the morning … I just get so obsessive and I won’t do anything else until the guitar part is done. And sometimes that spoils it for me because I feel like I can’t be objective because I’m just sick of it. Usually I’ll finish the guitar part completely, arrange it, write a vocal melody, and then write lyrics, and in between each section take like a month to chill and go back and listen to it and make sure it’s still special. It’s a weird mental process for me." She also stated in an interview with Independent Magazine in May 2018, "I wrote [Lush] over the span of a year-and-a-half, right up to being in the studio and having to write one or two more and then recording it the next day. I really took my time... I wanted it to be a really concise record as our debut, and I spent a lot of time trying to make everything exactly how I wanted it to be. All the people I worked with in the process of recording were amazing and wonderful. I had infinite resources coming from the Matador departments, which would be incredible. It was a really interesting experience packed full of surprises and difficulty, but it was really cool."

Jordan had a firm idea of what she wanted Lush to sound like, and her producer Jake Aron (who has worked with Solange and Grizzly Bear), said he was impressed by her poise. In an interview with The New York Times in May 2018, he said of Jordan's abilities, "The importance of what she’s saying is really central to what makes her music so special, so she really pushed me for clarity in the production... It’s crazy she knows this much." Lush was recorded with Jake Aron, who Lindsay Jordan chose based on his pop sensibilities and overall vibe.

Snail Mail had previously recorded their 2016 EP Habit live, and taking care and time to work on a studio album was a totally new experience for the band. Jordan suffered from bouts of severe anxiety while working on the album in upstate New York. She wasn’t used to the pressure of having to crank something out on someone else’s timeline, let alone a major indie label's. "It was like this fake-relaxing environment with a pond and animals and shit, and like trees and shit, so it was supposed to be relaxing but I was going crazy... I thought we were in purgatory." Jordan wrote about 30 songs that could have made it onto this album.

Release and promotion
The first single to be released from Lush was the song “Pristine”, which was released on March 18, 2018. An accompanying lyrical music video was released on March 21, 2018 which featured Lindsey Jordan singing the song surrounded by the song's lyrics and visuals based on the album artwork for Lush. The single would receive rave reviews from music critics, with Patrick Mcdermott from The Fader dubbing it an “indie rock masterpiece.” Mike Katzif of NPR gave the song a very positive review, writing "Rarely can we witness the creative progression unfold from prodigious potential to fully realized vision so quickly. But when watching Snail Mail perform on stage, or hearing how a song like "Pristine" can unwind poetically with such fearlessness, it's clear Lush represents the beginning for a musician with so much to say." In June of 2019, Lindsay Jordan and record producer Jake Aron re-recorded “Pristine” in Simlish for The Sims 4: Island Living.

”Heat Wave”, the album’s second single, was released on April 26, 2018. The single also features an accompanying music video directed by Brandon Herman which was released on the same day. The video features sequences of Lindsey Jordan playing ice hockey contrasted with footage of her performing the song alone. “Heat Wave” was well-received by critics, with Rolling Stone’s Simon Vozick-Levinson writing “Lindsey Jordan’s song for a green-eyed dream strikes as quick as lightning or a summer crush.” The single peaked at No. 94 on the Belgium Ultratop singles chart.

“Let’s Find an Out” was released on May 16, 2018 as the third and final single from Lush. While the first two singles can be considered fast indie rock songs with loud guitars and emotional vocals, “Let’s Find an Out” is much more delicate and calm song by comparison. The single would also go on to receive widespread acclaim. James Retting of Stereogum wrote in a review of the track, “It’s deftly played, just Jordan and a gorgeous weave of interlocking guitars, and it gets a lot across in only two minutes. The song straddles the line between hopeful and wistful; there’s talk of starting anew, but doubt over the possibility hangs in the air.”

Critical reception

At Metacritic, which assigns a normalized rating out of 100 to reviews from mainstream publications, Lush received an average score of 80 based on 25 reviews, indicating "generally positive reviews". Daisy Jones of Noisey described the album as "wrapped up in beauty and transcendence too, each song a vivid snapshot in time, with sadness lingering among all the other complex feelings." Robert Steiner of The Boston Globe expressed excitement for future projects from Jordan, describing how "with Lush full of resonating moments like these, it's exciting to think that Jordan's only getting started." Ryan Dombal of Pitchfork also praised the work of Jordan , comparing the album to the work of Liz Phair, Fiona Apple, and Frank Ocean. He would go on to say "Throughout the record, each line is given its own story. Every vocal feels deeply considered and felt, yet nothing is over-rehearsed. She knows precisely when to dial in and when to dial back, when to fully commit to her longing and when to step back and shake her head at it."

In a positive review, The A.V. Club awarded Lush an A−, while also writing "The crushing sameness of the existence described in Snail Mail’s music means that not every song on Lush is essential, but when Jordan hits, she hits a bullseye, with mini-indie masterpieces like “Pristine” and “Heat Wave” set to inspire another generation of songwriters."

Lush would go on to be ranked at No. 45 on Paste magazine's 100 Best Albums of the Decade, No. 48 in Stereogum's 100 Best Albums of the Decade, and No. 122 in Pitchfork's 200 Best Albums of the Decade.

"Pristine" was ranked No. 6 on Pitchfork's 100 Best Songs of the Year, No. 13 in Rolling Stone's 50 Best Songs of 2018, and No. 36 on The Guardian's Top 100 Songs of 2018.

Year-end lists

Track listing

Personnel
Credits adapted from the liner notes of Lush.

Band
 Lindsey Jordan – vocals; guitar
 Ray Brown – drums
 Alex Bass – bass

Additional musicians
 James Richardson – French horn 
 Sam Ubl – percussion 
 Jake Aron – piano; organ; ambient guitar; percussion

Production and artwork
 Jake Aron – producer; engineer; mixer
 Jonathan Schenke – engineer
 Joe LaPorta – mastering engineer
 Lucas Carpenter – assistant engineer
 Michael Lavine – photography
 Mike Zimmerman – design

Charts

References

External links

2018 debut albums
Snail Mail (musician) albums
Matador Records albums